Larisa Viktorovna Verbitskaya (born November 30, 1959, Feodosia, Crimean Oblast, Ukrainian SSR) is a Soviet and Russian announcer and TV presenter. In the past, the host of the popular TV show Good Morning (1987—2014).

Russian spokesperson in Eurovision Song Contest 2001 and Eurovision Dance Contest 2008.

Awards
 Merited Artist of the Russian Federation (2004) 
 Order of Friendship  (2006)

References

External links 
 Official site

1959 births
Living people
People from Feodosia
Russian television presenters
Russian women television presenters
Soviet television presenters
Honored Artists of the Russian Federation
Russian women journalists
Radio and television announcers